Eugênio Carlos de Souza (born 25 April 1963), sometimes known as just Eugênio, is a Brazilian football coach and former player who played as a defender.

Honours

Player
Cruzeiro
Campeonato Mineiro: 1982, 1987

Vila Nova
Campeonato Goiano: 1993

Manager
Itaúna
Campeonato Mineiro Segunda Divisão: 2007

Guarani-MG
Campeonato Mineiro Módulo II: 2010

Tombense
Campeonato Brasileiro Série D: 2014

Ipatinga
Campeonato Mineiro Segunda Divisão: 2017

References

External links

1963 births
Living people
Footballers from Belo Horizonte
Brazilian footballers
Association football defenders
Campeonato Brasileiro Série A players
Cruzeiro Esporte Clube players
São José Esporte Clube players
Vila Nova Futebol Clube players
Ceará Sporting Club players
Guarani Esporte Clube (MG) players
Brazilian football managers
Campeonato Brasileiro Série C managers
Campeonato Brasileiro Série D managers
Villa Nova Atlético Clube managers
Guarani Esporte Clube (MG) managers
Goytacaz Futebol Clube managers
Ipatinga Futebol Clube managers
Uberlândia Esporte Clube managers
Araxá Esporte Clube managers
Tombense Futebol Clube managers
Moto Club de São Luís managers
União Recreativa dos Trabalhadores managers
Associação Atlética Caldense managers
Esporte Clube Democrata managers
Tupi Football Club managers
Pouso Alegre Futebol Clube managers